Hegesias may refer to:

 Hegesias of Sinope, Cynic philosopher, c. 325 BC
 Hegesias of Cyrene, Cyrenaic philosopher, c. 300 BC
 Hegesias of Magnesia, Greek rhetorician and historian, c. 300 BC
 Hegesias or Hegesinus of Salamis, sometimes said to be the author of the lost epic Cypria
 Hegesias or Hegias of Athens, sculptor or possibly two sculptors of the generation before Phidias
 Hegias, Neoplatonist philosopher, c. 500 AD